Maga Magazinović (1882–1968) was a librarian and journalist, the first woman who brought modern dance to Serbia and fundamental struggle for gender equality. She was born in Užice in 1882. She was the first woman journalist in Politika newspaper where she wrote articles about articles on rhythm and forms of physical and spiritual education of youth, especially young women. She was also the first woman to graduate from the Faculty of Philosophy in Belgrade in 1904. Forty years Maga was professor of philosophy, German and Serbian language in the First female gymnasium. Maga Magazinović was also the first woman librarian in the National Library of Serbia and the first woman who was a journalist by vocation.

References

Serbian feminists
1882 births
1968 deaths